The fourth season of Shameless, an American comedy-drama television series based on the British series of the same name by Paul Abbott, premiered on January 12, 2014, at Sunday 9:00 p.m. EST on the Showtime television network. Executive producers are John Wells, Abbott and Andrew Stearn, with producer Michael Hissrich. The season concluded after 12 episodes on April 6, 2014. The show's season premiere brought in 1.69 million viewers, while the episode airing February 2, "Strangers on a Train", received 1.22 million total viewers, its lowest-rated episode of the season. The season finale scored 1.93 million viewers, becoming the show's highest-rated episode for the season.

Plot
Unlike previous seasons, the fourth season of Shameless begins shifting into a darker tone, with the season's core stories mainly revolving around Fiona's sudden trouble with the law and Frank's possible death. At the beginning of the season, Fiona is getting past the disappearance of Jimmy and adjusting to her new job at Worldwide Cup. Keeping the family afloat, she has begun dating her boss, Mike Pratt (Jake McDorman).

The lives of other characters have shifted: Lip no longer lives at the house, struggling to adjust to new life at Chicago Polytechnic. Sheila finds solace in online dating, and she meets a Native American cowboy that takes care of his junkie sister's five children. Kevin gets full ownership of the Alibi. Veronica is pregnant with triplets, though her surrogate mother Carol is also pregnant. After Carol gives birth, Carol decides she wants to raise the baby on her own. Debbie begins pining after an older boy, Matt (James Allen McCune). Mickey is depressed over the disappearance of Ian, and he has a strained relationship with his pregnant wife, Svetlana. Mickey eventually tracks down Ian, who has gone AWOL from the Army and now works at a sketchy gay bar with a new, odd behavior. Knowing that her husband is spending time with Ian, Svetlana begins to extort money from Mickey. During an after-party for his son's christening at the Alibi, Mickey publicly comes out. Terry tries to attack Mickey over the revelation, resulting in his arrest; the other Alibi regulars seem accepting of Mickey's sexuality.

Frank, in declining health, is returned home by the police, to most of the family's dismay. Forced to stay on the wagon, Frank is desperate for a new liver and reveals the existence of his oldest child, Sammi (Emily Bergl). To his surprise, Frank tracks Sammi down and discovers that he has a grandson, Chuckie. Frank makes a good impression on Sammi, who does not know that Frank is her father; Sammi is initially furious when she finds out the truth, but she eventually reconciles with Frank, wanting to begin a father/daughter relationship with him. Though she isn't a viable liver donor, Sammi cares for Frank as his health begins to deteriorate; Sheila, wanting to adopt the kids of her online boyfriend, marries Frank in order to increase her chances of winning custody, though she ultimately fails to do so. Frank is eventually given a last minute liver transplant.

Fiona's life is drastically turned upside down on her birthday. Against her better judgement, Fiona pursues a secret affair with Mike's brother, Robbie. Mike is devastated when he learns the truth, punching Robbie in the face and breaking up with Fiona. After being gifted a baggie of cocaine from Robbie, Fiona throws a party and snorts the cocaine; Liam gets into the stash of cocaine and is found unconscious in the kitchen. As the family rushes Liam to the hospital, Fiona is arrested and lands in county jail; she refuses to give up Robbie's name. Originally put on house arrest, Fiona goes on a bender with Robbie's friends and breaks her curfew. She is sent to a correctional facility for a 90-day sentence, wreaking havoc for the rest of the family.

Fiona's arrest leaves parental duties on Lip. Some unexpected assistance comes from an intelligent college student, Amanda (Nichole Bloom), who Lip eventually begins dating. Lip begins to put his previous relationship with Mandy behind him; Mandy is stuck in an abusive relationship with her boyfriend, Kenyatta. Ian finally turns up and reunites with his family, but his new behavior concerns both Mickey and the family, who compare Ian's odd behavior to Monica's bipolar disorder.

Fiona gets an early release from the correctional facility due to overcrowding. Thanks to her parole officer, Fiona gets a job as a waitress at the Golden House Restaurant, a diner managed by Charlie Peters (Jeffrey Dean Morgan). Frank is back to drinking with his new liver, and has simultaneously brought Sammi and Chuckie into the Gallaghers' lives. Mickey and Svetlana come to an understanding on how to raise their child. During the final episode, a post-credits scene reveals Jimmy, who has been absent the whole season, watching the Gallagher home from his car with an unnamed woman.

Cast and characters

Regular
 William H. Macy as Frank Gallagher
 Emmy Rossum as Fiona Gallagher
 Jeremy Allen White as Philip "Lip" Gallagher
 Ethan Cutkosky as Carl Gallagher
 Shanola Hampton as Veronica "V" Fisher
 Steve Howey as Kevin "Kev" Ball
 Emma Kenney as Debbie Gallagher
 Cameron Monaghan as Ian Gallagher
 Joan Cusack as Sheila Jackson (credited as "special guest star" in opening title sequence)
 Noel Fisher as Mickey Milkovich
 Emma Greenwell as Mandy Milkovich
 Jake McDorman as Mike Pratt (episodes 1–6)

Special guest stars
 Regina King as Gail Johnson
 Cherami Leigh as Robyn Hasseck
 Jeffrey Dean Morgan as Charlie Peters

Recurring
 Emily Bergl as Samantha "Sammi" Slott
 Vanessa Bell Calloway as Carol Fisher
 Isidora Goreshter as Svetlana
 James Allen McCune as Matty Baker
 Danika Yarosh as Holly Herkimer
 Nichole Bloom as Amanda
 Nick Gehlfuss as Robbie Prat
 Adam Cagley as Ron Kuzner
 Kellen Michael as Chuckie
 Michael Patrick McGill as Tommy
 Kerry O'Malley as Kate
 J. Michael Trautmann as Iggy Milkovich
 Jim Hoffmaster as Kermit
 Maile Flanagan as Connie
 Dennis Cockrum as Terry Milkovich
 Shel Bailey as Kenyatta
 Miguel Izaguirre as Paco

Episodes

Development and production
On January 29, 2013, Showtime announced the series would be renewed for a fourth season. The show's fourth season began production on September 20, 2013, and began filming the following week,<ref>"Amazing first table read with my #shameless family! This seasons gonna ROCK.". Twitter.com. Retrieved 2013-09-20.</ref> and premiered on Sunday, January 12, 2014.

Reception
Review aggregator Rotten Tomatoes gives the fourth season 100%, based on 15 reviews. The critics consensus reads, "Shameless'' shows no signs of fatigue as it barrels into its fourth season, with the Gallaghers stirring up new and novel forms of mischief."

DVD release

References

External links
 
 

2014 American television seasons
Shameless (American TV series)